Stadio Costante Girardengo is a football stadium located in Novi Ligure, Italy. It is the home to the Novese, currently competing in Serie D. It opened in 1966 and holds 3,500 spectators.

It is named after Costante Girardengo, an Italian professional road bicycle racer.

In the past, it has been also the home of Comolli Novi before the fusion with Aquanera and Aquanera Comollo Novi until its radiation.

References

External links
 Stadio Costante Girardengo at U.S. Novese official website

Football venues in Italy